Greatest Hits is a posthumous double-disc greatest hits album by American rapper 2Pac, released by Amaru Entertainment, Death Row Records, and Interscope Records on November 24, 1998.

The album's non-chronological sequence focuses on the highlights of 2Pac's career. 21 of his tracks are accompanied by four previously unreleased songs: "God Bless the Dead", "Unconditional Love", "Troublesome '96", and "Changes". Some tracks have alternate mixes, while the original mix of "California Love" makes its first proper album appearance after initially only being available as a single.

"Changes" earned 2Pac the first and only posthumous Grammy Award nomination for Best Rap Solo Performance. This is one of two 2Pac releases—and one of only nine hip hop albums—to have been certified Diamond in the United States.

Commercial performance
Greatest Hits debuted at number five on the US Billboard 200 chart, selling 268,000 copies in its first week. In January 1999, the album reached its peak at number three on the chart. It has spent 433 weeks on the Billboard 200. On October 16, 2000, it was certified 9× platinum. Nearly 11 years later, in June 2011, it was certified by the RIAA for shipments of over 10 million, the late rapper's first RIAA Diamond award. With 5.33 million units sold which is 10.66 million in RIAA sales, it remains the best-selling rap greatest hits compilation of all time and the twentieth best-selling rap album since Nielsen Soundscan began tracking record sales in 1991.

Tupac Shakur's virtual appearance at the annual Coachella Festival on April 15, 2012, spurred a re-entry for the album on the Billboard 200 chart; it jumped in at No. 129 with 4,000 copies sold according to Nielsen SoundScan (a gain of 571% over the previous week).

The album was certified Platinum by the BPI on 16 August 2002, making it 2Pac's highest selling album in the UK.

Track listing

Charts

Weekly charts

Year-end charts

Certifications

See also
List of best-selling albums in the United States
List of number-one R&B albums of 1998 (U.S.)

References

1998 greatest hits albums
Compilation albums published posthumously
Albums produced by DJ Quik
Albums produced by Dr. Dre
Albums produced by Daz Dillinger
Albums produced by Johnny "J"
Albums produced by Warren G
Amaru Entertainment albums
Interscope Records compilation albums
Tupac Shakur compilation albums
Death Row Records compilation albums
Gangsta rap compilation albums